Parbati River  may refer to:

Parbati River (Himachal Pradesh), India
Parbati River (Madhya Pradesh), India
Parbati River (Rajasthan), India